First-seeded Martina Hingis was the defending champion but lost in the final 6–3, 6–3 against second-seeded Lindsay Davenport.

Seeds

A champion seed is indicated in bold text while text in italics indicates the round in which that seed was eliminated. The top four seeds received a bye to the second round.

  Martina Hingis (final)
  Lindsay Davenport (champion)
  Amanda Coetzer (semifinals)
  Iva Majoli (semifinals)
  Irina Spîrlea (quarterfinals)
  Anke Huber (first round)
  Brenda Schultz-McCarthy (withdrew)
  Ai Sugiyama (quarterfinals)
  Ruxandra Dragomir (first round)

Draw

Final

Section 1

Section 2

External links
 1998 Toray Pan Pacific Open Draw

Pan Pacific Open
Toray Pan Pacific Open - Singles
1998 Toray Pan Pacific Open